Carnivores: Dinosaur Hunter is a first-person shooter video game and the fifth installment in the Carnivores series. The game was initially developed by Tatem Games and released for iOS in 2010, as an enhanced port of the original 1998 Carnivores game. Later that year, Tatem Games' version was ported by Beatshapers to the PlayStation 3 (PS3) and PlayStation Portable (PSP), as a PlayStation Minis. Tatem Games then brought its iOS port to Android in 2012.

Gameplay
Carnivores: Dinosaur Hunter is an updated port of the first Carnivores (1998), and follows a similar format set by the first three entries in the Carnivores series. The player is allowed to choose from a variety of locations to hunt in, multiple dinosaurs, and a varied array of weapons; time of day can be changed and a number of accessories can be taken to aid the player. The game provides a mixed roster of dinosaurs alongside other creatures used to populate the maps. Whilst these additional animals can be killed (with the exception of the Brachiosaurus), they do not grant the player any points.

Players start out hunting herbivorous dinosaurs, which flee upon spotting the player. Carnivorous dinosaurs such as Allosaurus and Velociraptor immediately go on the offensive after spotting the player but can be easily subdued, the Tyrannosaurus rex on the other hand requires a direct shot to the eyes before it can be killed. A feature exclusive to the mobile port is survival mode, which can be used to hone shot accuracy as multiple waves of dinosaurs swarm the player, while hunt mode allows the player to select specific dinosaurs to hunt. A total of 15 species are available, each having varying levels of sight, smell, and hearing to alert them of the hunter's presence. The choice of weapons is limited with only a pistol, shotgun, sniper rifle, and a crossbow. The use of a radar and a dinosaur call aids greatly in the capture of animals. In the PlayStation Portable/PlayStation 3 version of the game, the player can only choose one dinosaur at a time in each environment, while other dinosaurs appear for atmospheric purposes.

A new addition to the iOS port not present in the original Carnivores is the use of a leaderboard and support for social networking.

Development and release
Carnivores: Dinosaur Hunter was initially developed by Tatem Games for iOS, as a port of the original Carnivores game. The game was released for iOS on June 12 and July 8, 2010. Soon after, Beatshapers created a version of Tatem Game's port for the PlayStation Portable, also compatible with the PlayStation 3.

Beatshapers founder and chief executive officer Alexey Menshikov – an audio designer and sound programmer for the original Carnivores – stated that porting the game from iOS to PlayStation Portable was "pretty easy" overall, despite some issues: "The hardest issue was how to fit all of the data, including huge terrains, foliage, and dinosaurs with animations into the PSP's memory size." This issue delayed development for a month and a half while the team overcame the obstacle. Because of the PSP's memory limitations, the player is only able to select one dinosaur to hunt in each environment. Beatshapers increased the speed at which the player can swim through water, as Menshikov stated, "we found it too boring when a player slowly swims during his exploration." Development of the Beatshapers version lasted four and a half months.

In Europe, Beatshapers' version was released on August 11, 2010, via the PlayStation Store, marking the first time a Carnivores game was released for a Sony PlayStation console. Previous plans to release a Carnivores game for the PlayStation 2 in 2000 were shelved because of difficulty in getting approval from Sony. In North America, the PlayStation Minis version was released through the PlayStation Store on August 17, 2010. At the time of the PlayStation Minis release, Tatem Games was working on a high-resolution version of the game for iPad, while Menshikov stated that Beatshapers was considering releasing the game for Nintendo 3DS and Android. The possibility of a WiiWare release had also been discussed between Beatshapers and Nintendo, but it was not expected to occur in the near future.

Tatem Games ported its iOS version to Android and released it in the United States and Europe in June 2012. The Android release included a basic version that was free to download, as well as bundles that could be purchased to add new dinosaurs, locations, and weapons.

Reception

The iOS version received "generally favorable reviews", while the PlayStation and PSP versions received "generally unfavorable reviews", according to the review aggregation website Metacritic. Within two years of its launch, the iOS version had been downloaded six million times. Within eight days of its release, the Android version had 80,000 downloads via Google Play.

Riordan Frost of Slide to Play reviewed the iOS version and was critical of the difficulty and the "blocky" environments. Andrew Nesvadba of AppSpy noted that the iOS version could have a limited audience appeal because of its realism, although he praised the controls and stated that for hunting fans, the game was an "amazingly detailed title that's a true must-have, but casual gamers should take more care in considering this title." The A.V. Club, reviewing the iPhone version, noted that the game "lets you safely carry out" the fantasy of hunting dinosaurs in the modern era.

Folahan Olowoyeye, writing for Macworld, criticized the iPhone version for its "ludicrous" story and its "tedious" Hunt mode, and stated that the graphics and renderings "fail to make use of the capabilities" of the iPhone. Olowoyeye also believed that the game should have included more new features that were not in the original 1998 game, but stated that the game had "some moments of anachronistic fun."

Damien McFerran of Pocket Gamer stated that the iPhone version "plays like a dream, with responsive controls, smooth visuals, and an immersive hunting experience." However, he noted that impatient players might be disappointed with the game, and complained of little replay value upon the game's completion. McFerran called the game "Methodical and hugely satisfying" and one of the most "intriguing" action games available for the iPhone, stating that "the only real complaint is a lack of variety."

Sammy Barker of Push Square reviewed the PlayStation Minis version, criticizing it for tedious gameplay but concluding that fans of "slower paced shooters may get some enjoyment" out of the game.

Sequels and remaster
Carnivores: Dinosaur Hunter HD, a sequel in the Carnivores series and a modern remake of the original Carnivores (1998), was released in 2013.

Carnivores: Dinosaur Hunter Reborn, a sequel to Carnivores: Dinosaur Hunter, was released on May 27, 2015. The game was developed and published by Digital Dreams Entertainment, and was released for PC via Steam. The company had initially tried launching the game with a 2014 Kickstarter campaign, but was unsuccessful. Key members of the development team for the original Carnivores game reunited to create Carnivores: Dinosaur Hunter Reborn. A remastered version of Carnivores: Dinosaur Hunter Reborn was released on June 1, 2021, as Carnivores: Dinosaur Hunt. It was developed and published by Digital Dreams for Nintendo Switch, PlayStation 4, and Xbox One.

References

External links
 Carnivores: Dinosaur Hunter official page
 Carnivores: Dinosaur Hunter Reborn official page
 

2010 video games
Android (operating system) games
Beatshapers games
Dinosaur hunting
Dinosaurs in video games
First-person shooters
Hunting video games
IOS games
PlayStation 3 games
PlayStation Network games
PlayStation Portable games
PlayStation Store games
Single-player video games
Video games developed in Ukraine
Video games set in the 22nd century